Niels Fiil (12 June 1920 – 29 June 1944) was a member of the Danish resistance executed by the German occupying power.

Biography 

Fiil was born in Hvidsten on 12 June 1920 to house proprietor and bicycle dealer Marius Fiil and wife Gudrun Fiil.

In 1930 he lived in Hvidsten Inn with his 72-year-old grandfather as inn keeper, his parents and four sisters and a farm hand, a maid and a manager.

He was confirmed in Spentrup church in 1934 on the first Sunday after Easter, while living in Hvidsten with his family. He received his confirmation with a waiver, since he had not yet turned 14.

During the occupation the family and other locals formed a resistance group, the Hvidsten group.

In addition to being a member of the Hvidsten group, Fiil was also a farmer while helping out at the inn.

The group helped the British Special Operations Executive parachute weapons and supplies into Denmark for distribution to the resistance.

In March 1944 the Gestapo made an "incredible number of arrests" including in the region of Randers Fiil, his father the "nationally known folklore collector and keeper of Hvidsten inn Marius Fiil", his 17-year-old sister Gerda, his sister Kirstine and her husband brewery worker Peter Sørensen.

The following month De frie Danske reported that several arrestees from Hvidsten had been transferred from Randers to Vestre Fængsel.

On 29 June 1944 Fiil, his father Marius, his brother in law and five other members of the Hvidsten group were executed in Ryvangen.

After his death 
On 15 July 1944 De frie Danske reported on the execution of Fiil, his father and brother son in law, the life sentence of his older sister and the two-year sentence of his younger sister and lamented the profound loss of Fiil's mother. Six months later the January 1945 issue of the resistance newspaper Frit Danmark (Free Denmark) reported that on 29 June the previous year Fiil and seven other named members of the Hvidsten group had been executed.

On 2 July 1945 the remains and Fiil and his father were found in Ryvangen and transferred to the Department of Forensic Medicine of the university of Copenhagen. The remains of the six other executed members of the group were found in the same area three days later.

The following day an inquest in the Department of Forensic Medicine of the university of Copenhagen showed that Fiil was executed with gunshot wounds to the chest.

On 10 July he was together with the seven other executed group members cremated at Bispebjerg Cemetery.

In 1945 a memorial stone over the eight executed members of the Hvidsten group was raised near Hvidsten kro.

Similarly a larger memorial stone for resistance members including the eight executed members of the Hvidsten group has been laid down in Ryvangen Memorial Park.

Portrayal in the media
 In the 2012 Danish drama film Hvidsten Gruppen (This Life) Niels Fiil is portrayed by Thomas Ernst.

References 

 
 

1920 births
1944 deaths
Danish people executed by Nazi Germany
Danish people of World War II
Danish resistance members
Resistance members killed by Nazi Germany